The Court of Disputed Returns is a court, tribunal, or some other body that determines disputes about elections in some common law countries. The court may be known by another name such as the Court of Disputed Elections. In countries that derive their legal tradition from the United Kingdom, the legal tradition is that Parliament is the supreme law-making body in the country. The same tradition mandates that as Parliament is sovereign, it alone has authority and jurisdiction to determine who and how a person can be elected to Parliament. Implicit in that authority is the jurisdiction to determine whether a person has been validly elected, which is commonly known as a "disputed return" and gives the court its name. The court is an attempt to eliminate the partisan nature of parliament and give the determination of electoral disputes to an independent and dispassionate neutral body. As parliament has the sole authority to determine these matters, parliament must create a special law to bring that body into existence to determine those disputes.

A court of disputed returns may be constituted in a number of ways. The first is by the creation of a special court to perform that function. That has occurred in the Northern Territory, Australia, which has a special and separate court determines those disputes.

Another way is for an existing court to be given the role of the court of disputed returns. Commonly, the phrase "the x court shall be the court of disputed returns". In this case, a separate court is not created, but the existing court is made into and given the jurisdiction of the court of disputed returns. The High Court of Australia, the Supreme Court of New South Wales and the Supreme Court of Victoria are each invested as courts of disputed returns in this manner.

A court may also be simply be the venue for the determination of disputed returns. In New South Wales, the Land and Environment Court determines electoral disputes but is not a court of disputed returns.

In some jurisdictions, the parliament of that country retains the right to determine disputed returns concurrently with the court of disputed returns. Then, both the parliament and the court may both decide the issue.

Generally courts of disputed return have no rights of appeal, but that depends on the law that constitutes the court.

History
Prior to 1405, there was no codified process for resolving electoral disputes. Those disputes were resolved through what is described by authors Graeme Orr and George Williams as "custom, force and administrative action". This meant that there were no real rules in place to determine how these disputes were resolved. The manner of resolving a dispute in one county might be totally different from another county, or may result in a different outcome even if the same procedure was followed.

The first laws to regulate elections in England were passed in the reign of Henry IV. This was through the law numbered "7 Henry IV ch 15" and called "The manner of the Election of Knights of the Shire for a Parliament", made in 1405. The law came about due to the confusion caused when letters were purportedly issued disqualifying lawyers from voting or being elected. In 1429, a law was passed allowing the common law courts to become involved in the determination of these disputes. In the 16th century, it was commonly regarded that the Court of Chancery could determine electoral disputes, particularly as that court issued the various writs to the sheriff and compiled their returns on the election 

During the reign of Elizabeth I, the election for Norfolk was disputed in 1586. The Court of Chancery investigated and decided to issue writs for a new election. However, the House of Commons set up its own committee which upheld the election. In 1604, during the reign of James I, a dispute arose as to the election of Sir Francis Goodwin for the seat of Buckinghamshire. The Court of Chancery investigated and determined that a new election should occur. However, the House of Commons established its own committee and found that Goodwin was validly elected. A compromise was made between the King and the House by holding a fresh election.

From the early 17th century, the resolution of disputed returns became accepted as being the prerogative of Parliament. The Court of Chancery then became the means of administering the election process, but Parliament became the arbiter of disputes.

By the 18th century, the process of Parliament determining disputes became tainted. The holding of a seat in Parliament became very valuable. Voting in Parliament had consolidated into voting along party lines. Issues were determined according to the numbers rather than the merits. Grenville’s Act of 1770 established a jury system to reform the process but that process did not satisfactorily resolve the problem.

In 1868 Parliament handed its power to determine disputes to the common law courts. Orr and Williams describe this as a "hot potato" that the courts reluctantly took on. The power was given to two judges of the Queen's Bench. It was described as being "what, according to British ideas, are normally the rights and privileges of the Assembly itself, always jealously maintained and guarded in complete independence of the Crown."

Australia

In most states, the Court of Disputed Returns is the supreme court of that state.

Federal
The High Court of Australia is the Court of Disputed Returns for national elections in Australia. See section 354 of the Commonwealth Electoral Act 1918 (Cth).

Australian Capital Territory
In the Australian Capital Territory, the Supreme Court is known as the Court of Disputed Elections for the purposes of the Electoral Act 1992 (ACT).

New South Wales

In New South Wales, Supreme Court shall be the Court of Disputed Returns under the Parliamentary Electorates and Elections Act 1912 for state elections. For elections of officers to Aboriginal Land Councils under the Aboriginal Land Rights Act 1983 (NSW), or a Rural Lands Board under the Rural Lands Protection Act 1998, the Land and Environment Court acts to consider disputed returns.

Northern Territory
The Northern Territory has established the Court of Disputed Returns under the Electoral Act 2004 (NT) as a separate court to determine these disputes.

Queensland

A dispute about an election may be made by petition to the Supreme Court sitting as the Court of Disputed Returns under the Electoral Act 1992 (Qld).

South Australia
In South Australia, the Supreme Court is the Court of Disputed Returns under the Electoral Act 1985 (SA).

For local government elections, there is a Court of Disputed Returns constituted under which a District Court judge may be appointed.

Victoria
The Supreme Court of Victoria is the Court of Disputed Returns under the Electoral Act 2002 (Vic).

Western Australia
For state elections Section 157 of the Electoral Act (WA) provides that the validity of any election or return may be disputed by petition addressed to the Court of Disputed Returns. The court is constituted by a judge of the Supreme Court of Western Australia sitting in open Court.

For local government elections, the Magistrates Court is the Court of Disputed Returns under the Local Government Act 1995 (WA).

Fiji
The High Court of Fiji is the Court of Disputed Returns for the Island of Fiji under section 73 of the Constitution (Amendment) Act 1997.

Hong Kong 
In Hong Kong, electoral legislations establish that the Court of First Instance of the territory's High Court (previously the High Court of Justice of the Supreme Court) would hear election petitions. The sole exception would be selection of the territory's Chief Executive after 1997: Such petitions would directly be heard by the Court of Final Appeal as provided for in the Chief Executive Election Ordinance 2001.

New Zealand
The power to determine electoral disputes was transferred to the courts in 1880 by the Election Petitions Act 1880. Before this, disputes were determined by the Parliament. The change arose through two different election results on identical petitions.

Papua New Guinea
Questions on electoral disputes are referred to the National Court of Papua New Guinea under the Organic Law on National and Local-level Government Elections 2003 (PNG).

See also
 :Category:Election law in the United Kingdom
 Election law

References

Sources
  (2001) 23 Sydney Law Review 53.
  (1997) 20 University of NSW Law Journal 257
  (2005) 3 New Zealand Journal of Public and International Law 139
 

Courts of Australia
Law of New Zealand
English law